Ancient and noble French family names,  Jacques, Jacq, or James are believed to originate from the Middle Ages in the historic northwest Brittany region in France, and have since spread around the world over the centuries. To date, there are over one hundred identified noble families related to the surname by the Nobility & Gentry of Great Britain & Ireland.

Origins 

The origin of this surname ultimately originates from the Latin, Jacobus, which belongs to an unknown progenitor.  Jacobus comes from the Hebrew name, Yaakov, which translates as "one who follows" or "to follow after".

Ancient history 
A French knight returning from the Crusades in the Holy Lands probably adopted the surname from "Saint Jacques" (or "James the Greater"). James the Greater was one of Jesus' Twelve Apostles, and is believed to be the first martyred apostle. Being endowed with this surname was an honor at the time and it is likely that the Church allowed it because of acts during the Crusades. Indeed, at this time, the use of biblical, Christian, or Hebrew names and surnames became very popular, and entered the European lexicon.

Robert J., a Knight Crusader in 1248, was the first documented use of the surname. Since then, several personalities who have glorified this surname: Guillaume, secretary of the Duke and auditor of the account in 1413; Thomas, the Archdeacon of Penthievre, the Prior of Pirmil, the Bishop of Leon in 1478, transferred to Dol in 1482, the ambassador of the duke to the Pope in 1486, who died in 1503, and is interred in his cathedral; Jean, the Canon of Dol and Prior of Lehon; François, Lord of the Ville-Carré, and the Provost Marshal in 1577; and Captain of Ploërmel, who prospered in Rennes in 1621; Bernard, a Rennes counsellor in 1653. The widespread use of surnames was not evident in Europe until the mid-to-late 16th century, and prior usage was restricted to the noble class.

Spread of surname use into the UK and its spelling variations 

The use of surnames reached England during the conquest by an army of Norman, Breton, Flemish, and French soldiers under William the Conqueror. The names became anglicised following the conquest. Over the centuries the spelling of the Jack surname has changed and developed as the French language became increasingly associated with high culture and status. Several European kings have thus adopted the name. Jack appears in the records spelled as Jacques, Jaques, Jack, Jacks, Jackes, Jakes, Jeeks, Jeke, Jeex, Jaquiss, Jaquez and Jaquis, with spelling variations even occurring in documents referring to the same person. There are several explanations for this situation. Latin, as a language used by educated men, and the language of the Anglo-Saxons both had a profound impact on the spelling and pronunciation of Norman names. On the other hand, the Norman language affected the development of English. As the English language developed from its Germanic roots into Middle English (which was influenced by Norman French) we find a period during which spelling was not standardised but roughly followed phonetic pronunciation. During this time names were spelled a variety of ways depending upon local dialects. Thus the surname, as well as the Anglo-Saxon names, were recorded in many different ways.

Early history 

Norman surnames like Jack are sometimes mistakenly considered French, though Normans (a term derived from "Northmen"), were of partial Viking origin. In 911, Vikings settled in their namesake region, Normandy, in current day France, where their language merged with that of locals. Throughout this period, England also endured Viking invasions, but the Anglo-Saxons successfully repelled them until 994. When the Danes ruled England, the Saxon royal family lived in Normandy and intermarried with the Duke of Normandy's family. William II, Duke of Normandy, could then claim the English throne when his cousin, Edward the Confessor, the restored Saxon king, died without an heir.

At the Battle of Hastings, William's army defeated their rival, King Harold Godwin, who was killed in the engagement. William could then claim the throne as Harold was elected and not a true member of the royal family. Despite the success of the foreign "conquest," English nobles were permitted to retain their land unless they rebelled. Any resisting English elite had their lands confiscated, and some of them fled into exile as a result. William granted lands to his followers and built commanding military strongpoint castles for defence of his realm.  By 1086, more than 92% of English nobles were replaced by William's followers. One of these followers is believed to be an ancestor of the surname, Jack.

Early notables 

Historians have studied documents such as the Domesday Book, compiled by William I of England, in search of the first record of the Jack surname, and found it to be of Norman origin, first appearing in Yorkshire where they held a family seat as Lords of the Manor of Nether Silton in the North Riding of the region. At the time of the Doomsday Book in 1086, Nether Silton was recorded as a village with a hall and the tenant-in-chief was the Count of Mortain.

The first recorded spelling of the family name is shown to be that of William Jagge, from Cambridgeshire dated 1251, in the "Chartulary of Ramsey Abbey", during the reign of King Henry III, who was known as "The Frenchman", 1216 – 1272, a witness in the Assize Court Rolls of Cambridgeshire in 1260.

Katherine Jeke of Wikington in Stafford married Robert Farnham, Lord of Querndon in 1440. The family later acquired estates at Easby Abbey and Elvington. Of this latter branch, Sir Roger Jaques was Lord Mayor of York in 1639, and knighted by King Charles I. Sir John Jacques was also knighted by King Charles I in 1628. The family branched into Middlesex. Mary, daughter of Thomas Jacques of Leeds, married Robert Gosforth of Northumberland in 1818. The present seat of the family is at Easby Abbey.

Before the usage of surnames became common, differentiating between generations also led to ‘son of Jack’ becoming Jackson, most notably with President Andrew Jackson of South Carolina. The Jackson family had immigrated from Ireland during the colonial period. Jackson led American forces at the Battle of New Orleans in the War of 1812. Due to favorable weather conditions, and his overall leadership, Britain suffered one of her worst defeats in their overseas colonial history. His fame as a general helped him to become the seventh US president later in his life.

People with the surname Jacques

Bob Jacques, rugby league footballer who played in the 1900s
Brian Jacques (1939–2011), British author and radio host, known primarily for the Redwall series
Cheryl Jacques (born 1962), American activist
 David Jacques ((fl. 2022), British garden historian
Hattie Jacques (1922–1980), British comedy actress
Jean-François Jacques (born 1985), Canadian professional hockey player
Jeph Jacques (born 1980), American webcomic artist
Kateřina Jacques (born 1971), Czech politician
Leslie Innes Jacques (1897-1959), British Army engineers officer
Martin Jacques (born 1945), British journalist, former editor of Marxism Today
Martyn Jacques (born 1959), British musician, singer and songwriter, founder of The Tiger Lillies
Reginald Jacques (1894–1969), English choral and orchestral conductor
Rémy Jacques (1817–1905), French lawyer and politician.
Richard Jacques (born 1973), British composer
Richard Jacques (military officer) (1704–1745), American colonial officer during Father Rale's War
Victor Jacques British brigadier of the Second World War

Jacques as given name

Jacques (Quebec French pronunciation) is the French equivalent of James, ultimately originating from the name Jacob.

Jacques is derived from the Late Latin Iacobus, from the Greek  (Septuagintal Greek ), from the Hebrew name Jacob . (See Jacob.) James is derived from Iacomus, a variant of Iacobus.

As a first name, Jacques is often phonetically converted to English as Jacob, Jake (from Jacob), or Jack.
Jack, from Jankin, is usually a diminutive of John but can also be used as a short form for many names derived from Jacob like Jacques. For example, in French "Jacky" is commonly used as a nickname for Jacques, in Dutch "Jack" is a pet form of Jacob or Jacobus along with the other nicknames "Sjaak", "Sjaakie" and "Jaak". In Swedish, it is "Jacke" for Jacob or Jakob and in German it is "Jackel" or "Jockel" for Jakob.

People with the given name Jacques

Jacques I (1689–1751), Prince of Monaco
Jacques Abady (1872–1964), British lawyer
Jacques Anquetil (1934–1987), French cyclist 
Jacques Arnold (born 1947), English politician and MP for Gravesham (1987–1997)
Jacques Barzun (1907–2012), French-born American historian
Jacques Beckers (born 1934), Dutch-born American astrophysicist
Jacques Brel (1929–1978), Belgian singer and songwriter
Jacques Brinkman (born 1966), Dutch field hockey player and coach
Jacques-Yves Cousteau (1910–1997), French underwater explorer
Jacques Cartier (1491–1557), French explorer
Jacques Chapiro (1887–1972), painter
Jacques Chirac (1932–2019), French politician
Jacques D'Amours (born 1956/57), Canadian businessman
Jacques Delors (born 1925), French politician
Jacques de Molay (c. 1243–1314), last Grand Master of the Knights Templar
Jacques Deray (1929–2003), French film director and screenwriter
Jacques Derrida (1930–2004), Algerian-born French philosopher
Jacques du Toit (cricketer) (born 1980), South African-born cricketer
Jacques du Toit (rugby union) (born 1993), South African-born rugby union player
Jacques Dutronc (born 1943), French singer and actor
Jacques Ellul (1912–1994), French philosopher
Jacques Erwin (1908–1957), French actor 
Jacques Faty (born 1984), Senegalese footballer
Jacques Feyder (1885–1948), Belgian film director
Jacques Follorou (born 1968), French journalist
Jacques Frémontier (born surname Friedman; 1930–2020), French journalist and television producer
Jacques Gaillot (born 1935), French social activist and Roman Catholic Bishop
Jacques Grimaldi, Hereditary Prince of Monaco, Marquis de Baux (born 2014), heir to the Monegasque throne
Jacques Hanegraaf (born 1960), Dutch cyclist
Jacques Ibert (1880–1962), French composer of classical music
Jacques Kallis (born 1975), South African cricketer
Jacques La Degaillerie (born 1940), French fencer
Jacques Lacan (1901–1981), French psychiatrist and psychoanalyst
Jacques Landry (born 1969), Canadian cyclist
Jacques le Gris (1330-1386) Squire/Knight who was killed in a judicial duel in France after he was accused of assaulting the wife of his former friend, Jean de Carrouges.
Jacques Loeb (1859–1924), German-born American physiologist and biologist
Jacques-Louis David (1748–1825), French neo-classical painter
Jacques Maritain (1882–1973), French Catholic philosopher 
Jacques Marquette (1637–1675), French explorer, led first European expedition to the northern Mississippi River
Jacques Massu (1908–2002), French general
Jacques Mazoin (1929–2020), French rugby union player and coach
Jacques Monod (1910–1976), French biologist and Nobel Prize recipient
Jacques Ochs (1883–1971), Belgian Olympic champion épée fencer
Jacques Offenbach (1819–1880), German born French composer, notable for composing the "Can Can"
Jacques Onana (born 1993), Cameroonian footballer
Jacques Parizeau (1930–2015), Premier of Québec
Jacques Pépin (born 1935), French chef
Jacques Plante (1929–1986), Canadian professional ice hockey goaltender
Jacques Prévert (1900–1977), French poet and screenwriter
Jacques Pucheran (1817–1894), French zoologist
Jacques Puisais (1927–2020), French oenologist
Jacques Rancière (born 1940), French philosopher
Jacques Robert (film director) (1890–1928), Swiss silent actor and film director in the 1910s and 1920s
Jacques Riparelli (born 1983), Cameroonian-born Italian athlete
Jacques Rit (born 1949), Monegasque politician
Jacques Rivette (1928–2016), French filmmaker
Jacques Rogge (1942–2021), Belgian sports administrator, president of the International Olympic Committee
Jacques Rougeau (born 1960), Canadian professional wrestler
Jacques Rudolph (born 1981), South African cricketer
Jacques Stas (born 1969), Belgian basketball coach and former player
Jacques Stroweis, special effects artist
Jacques Sylla (born 1946), Malagasy politician, former Prime Minister of Madagascar
Jacques Tati (1907–1982), French filmmaker
Jacques Villeneuve (born 1971), Canadian racing driver
Jacques Webster (born 1992), known as Travis Scott, American rapper
Jacques Yoko (born 1972), French volleyball player
Jacques Zabor (1941–2007), French actor
Jacques Zon (1872–1932), Dutch painter

Fictional characters 
Jacques, a cleaner shrimp, in the Finding Nemo franchise
Dr. Jacques von Hämsterviel, from the Lilo & Stitch franchise
Jacques Blanc, from the Onimusha video game series
Jacques, boss character and level name from the original Spyro the Dragon video game
Jacques the Scratcher, a  boss from the computer game Wizard 101
Jacques Beaupierre, character in the Aaron Elkins novel Skeleton Dance
Jacques LeFleur, a character in the cartoon M.A.S.K. (TV series)
Jacques Snicket, a character in the A Series of Unfortunate Events novel series
Jacques Dubrinsky, a character in Carpathian Novels series by Christine Feehan
Jacques Schnee, a character in the animated web series RWBY
Inspector Jacques Clouseau, the detective from The Pink Panther series
Jacques De Boys, from William Shakespeare's As You Like It
Jacques, a character from the animated series The Ridonculous Race
Jacques Silvert, a character from Rachilde's 19th-century novel Monsieur Vénus
Jacques Ooi, a recurring character in the Singaporean sitcom The Noose

See also 
 Jacqueline (given name)
 Jaques, name list
 Jean-Jacques, name list

References 

Surnames from given names
French masculine given names